Sakda Fai-in (born April 17, 1991) is a Thai professional footballer who plays as a defender for Thai League 3 club Kanjanapat.

Honours
Thailand U-23
 BIDC Cup (Cambodia): 2013

External links
  at Soccerway

1991 births
Living people
Sakda Fai-in
Sakda Fai-in
Association football defenders
Sakda Fai-in
Sakda Fai-in
Sakda Fai-in